is a private university in Shibata, Niigata, Japan. The predecessor of the school was founded in 1967. It opened as a college in 1991.

External links
 Official website 

Educational institutions established in 1967
Christian universities and colleges in Japan
Private universities and colleges in Japan
Universities and colleges in Niigata Prefecture
Shibata, Niigata
1967 establishments in Japan